The Philippine Senate Committee on Cultural Communities and Muslim Affairs is a standing committee of the Senate of the Philippines.

Jurisdiction 
According to the Rules of the Senate, the committee handles all matters relating to cultural communities in the Philippines and the Islamic Religion.

Members, 19th Congress 
Based on the Rules of the Senate, the Senate Committee on Cultural Communities has 9 members.

The President Pro Tempore, the Majority Floor Leader, and the Minority Floor Leader are ex officio members.

Here are the members of the committee in the 19th Congress as of September 30, 2022:

Committee secretary: Bernadine B. Mahinay

See also 

 List of Philippine Senate committees

References 

Cultural